The North of England appeared in first-class cricket between 1836 and 1961, most often in the showcase North v South matches against the South of England, although there were also games against touring teams, MCC and others.

The inaugural North v South fixture, was held at Lord's on 11 and 12 July 1836.  The North won by six wickets.

References

External sources
 CricketArchive – list of fixtures

Further reading
 Rowland Bowen, Cricket: A History of its Growth and Development, Eyre & Spottiswoode, 1970
 Arthur Haygarth, Scores & Biographies, Volume 2 (1827-1840), Lillywhite, 1862

Former senior cricket clubs
Northern England